Attorney General Davies may refer to:

John C. Davies (lawyer) (1857–1925), Attorney General of New York
John Mark Davies (1840–1919), Attorney General of Victoria

See also
William Rees-Davies (judge) (1863–1939), Attorney General of Hong Kong
Attorney General Davie (disambiguation)
Attorney General Davis (disambiguation)
General Davies (disambiguation)